Godsmack is an American rock band founded in 1995 by singer Sully Erna and bassist Robbie Merrill. The band has released eight studio albums, one EP, two compilations, three video albums, and thirty-one singles. Erna and Merrill recruited local friend and guitarist Lee Richards and drummer Tommy Stewart to complete the band's lineup. In 1996, Tony Rombola replaced Richards, as the band's guitarist. In 1998, Godsmack released their self-titled debut album, a remastered version of the band's self-released debut, All Wound Up.... The album was distributed by Universal/Republic Records and shipped four million copies in the United States. In 2001, the band contributed the track "Why" to the Any Given Sunday soundtrack. After two years of touring, the band released Awake. Although the album was a commercial success, it failed to match the sales of Godsmack. In 2002, Stewart left the band due to personal differences, and was replaced by Shannon Larkin.

The band's third album, Faceless (2003), debuted at number one on the US Billboard 200. In 2004, Godsmack released an acoustic-based EP titled The Other Side. The EP debuted at number five on the Billboard 200 and was certified gold by the RIAA. The band contributed the track "Bring It On" to the Madden 2006 football game in 2005; this track is not featured on any known album or compilation. The band released its fourth studio album, IV, in 2006. IV was the band's second release to debut at number one, and has since been certified platinum. After touring in support of IV for over a year, Godsmack released a greatest hits album called Good Times, Bad Times... Ten Years of Godsmack. The album included every Godsmack single (with the exception of "Bad Magick"), a cover of the Led Zeppelin song "Good Times Bad Times" and a DVD of the band's acoustic performance at the House of Blues in Las Vegas, Nevada.

Their fifth studio album, The Oracle, was released on May 4, 2010. The album debuted at number one on the Billboard 200, making Godsmack one of the few bands with three consecutive albums that debuted at #1 on the chart, a feat that also has been accomplished by Van Halen, U2, Metallica, Dave Matthews Band, Staind, Disturbed,  Linkin Park, Tool, and Slipknot.

The band released their most recent and seventh studio album, When Legends Rise, on April 27, 2018.

Albums

Studio albums

Live albums

Compilation albums

Video albums

EPs

Singles

Music videos

Guest appearances

Notes

A  "Whatever" did not enter the Billboard Hot 100, but peaked at number 16 on the Bubbling Under Hot 100 Singles chart, which acts as a 25-song extension to the Hot 100.
B  "Voodoo" did not enter the Billboard Hot 100, but peaked at number 2 on the Bubbling Under Hot 100 Singles chart, which acts as a 25-song extension to the Hot 100.
C  "Awake" did not enter the Billboard Hot 100, but peaked at number 3 on the Bubbling Under Hot 100 Singles chart, which acts as a 25-song extension to the Hot 100.
D  "Greed" did not enter the Billboard Hot 100, but peaked at number 23 on the Bubbling Under Hot 100 Singles chart, which acts as a 25-song extension to the Hot 100.
E  "I Stand Alone" did not enter the Billboard Hot 100, but peaked at number 3 on the Bubbling Under Hot 100 Singles chart, which acts as a 25-song extension to the Hot 100.
F  "Serenity" did not enter the Billboard Hot 100, but peaked at number 13 on the Bubbling Under Hot 100 Singles chart, which acts as a 25-song extension to the Hot 100.
G  "Running Blind" did not enter the Billboard Hot 100, but peaked at number 23 on the Bubbling Under Hot 100 Singles chart, which acts as a 25-song extension to the Hot 100.
H  "Good Times Bad Times" did not enter the Billboard Hot 100, but peaked at number 24 on the Bubbling Under Hot 100 Singles chart, which acts as a 25-song extension to the Hot 100.
I  "Whiskey Hangover" did not enter the Billboard Hot 100, but peaked at number 2 on the Bubbling Under Hot 100 Singles chart, which acts as a 25-song extension to the Hot 100.

References

External links
 Official website
 

Discography
Discographies of American artists
Heavy metal group discographies